The Elk Valley Blazers were a senior men's ice hockey team that played out of Fernie, British Columbia. They played in the Western International Hockey League from 1979 until the league folded in 1988. They won the last league championship and the Savage Cup in 1987-88.

Defunct ice hockey teams in Canada
Ice hockey teams in British Columbia
Western International Hockey League teams
1979 establishments in British Columbia
1988 disestablishments in British Columbia
Ice hockey clubs established in 1979
Ice hockey clubs disestablished in 1988